Gino Buzzanca (8 March 1912 – 5 May 1985) was an Italian film actor.

Life and career 
Born in Messina, Buzzanca began his career on stage,  specializing as an actor of the Sicilian language theater, and starring in works by Luigi Pirandello and Giovanni Verga. Discovered by Luigi Zampa, who offered him a role of weight in the film Easy Years, Buzzanca then had a long film career as a character actor, often cast in negative roles. He also appeared in several Spaghetti Westerns, usually credited as Bill Jackson. He was the uncle of the actor Lando Buzzanca.

Partial filmography  

 Easy Years (1953) - Barone Ferdinando LaPrua
 Woman of Rome (1954) - Riccardo
 Due lacrime (1954) - Tony
 The Art of Getting Along (1955) - Il barone Mazzei
 Are We Men or Corporals? (1955) - Il regista
 Il bidone (1955) - Saro (uncredited)
 Yalis, la vergine del Roncador (1955)
 Agguato sul mare (1955) - Elia
 A Woman Alone (1956)
 Vendicata! (1956)
 Roland the Mighty (1956)
 Peccato di castità (1956)
 Parola di ladro (1957)
 Addio sogni di gloria (1957)
 Doctor and the Healer (1957) - Il sindaco di Pianetta
 A sud niente di nuovo (1957)
 Rascel-Fifì (1957) - Gionata - il capo della gang
 L'amore nasce a Roma (1958) - padre di Mario
 Serenatella sciuè sciuè (1958) - don Ciccillo
 Caporale di giornata (1958) - Commendator Bianconi
 Conspiracy of the Borgias (1959)
 Arriva la banda (1959) - Il padre di Anna
 Il cavaliere senza terra (1959)
 I mafiosi (1959) - John Mistretta
 Prepotenti più di prima (1959) - Rosario
 Perfide.... ma belle (1959)
 Nel blu dipinto di blu (1959) - The Sicilian Industrialist
 Guardatele ma non toccatele (1959) - Maggiore
 Tipi da spiaggia (1959) - Giovanni Buzzanca - the theatre manager
 Gentlemen Are Born (1960)
 Colossus and the Amazon Queen (1960) - Mercante #2
 Robin Hood and the Pirates (1960) - Capitan Uncino
 Caravan petrol (1960)
 Garibaldi (1961) - Rosa's Father
 L'onorata società (1961) - Salvatore Zappalà
 The Secret of the Black Falcon (1961) - Gouverneur di Melida
 Totòtruffa 62 (1961) - The Ambassador of Nicarogua
 The Fascist (1961)
 Maciste contro Ercole nella valle dei guai (1961)
 L'urlo dei bolidi (1961)
 Caribbean Hawk (1962) - Nobleman (uncredited)
 Duel of Fire (1962) - Barone Carteri
 Musketeers of the Sea (1962) - Capo Ciurma Gutierrez
 Love in Four Dimensions (1964)
 I due mafiosi (1964) - Don Calogero
 I due toreri (1965) - Maresciallo
 Soldati e caporali (1965) - Maresciallo Luigi Donatone
 Two Mafiosi Against Goldginger (1965) - (uncredited)
 Due mafiosi contro Al Capone (1966) - Calogero
 Ringo and Gringo Against All (1966) - Il messicano
 I due sanculotti (1966) - Executioner
 Giorno caldo al Paradiso Show (1966)
 7 monaci d'oro (1966) - Alfio
 Cjamango (1967)
 The Handsome, the Ugly, and the Stupid (1967) - Bookmaker
 Don't Wait, Django... Shoot! (1967) - Don Alvarez (final film role)

References

External links 
 

1912 births
1985 deaths
Italian male film actors  
Italian male stage actors
Actors from Messina
20th-century Italian male actors